Kars is a civil parish in Kings County, New Brunswick, Canada.

For governance purposes it forms the local service district of the parish of Kars, which is a member of Regional Service Commission 8 (RSC8).

Origin of name
The parish was named for the Siege of Kars, last major operation of the Crimean War.

History
Kars was erected in 1860 from Greenwich and Springfield Parishes.

In 1877 the islands in Belleisle Bay were added to Kars.

Boundaries
Kars Parish is bounded:

on the northwest by the Queens County line;
on the east by the eastern line of three grants, beginning on the county line about 900 metres northeast of the ends of Bond Road and McCrea Road, then running southeasterly, with two short doglegs, past Vail Road to strike Belleisle Bay about 450 metres east of the eastern end of Coreyvale Road;
on the south by Belleisle Bay;
on the west by the Saint John River;
including Hog Island and Pig Island near the mouth of Belleisle Bay and Ghost Island in the bay.

Governance
The entire parish forms the local service district of the parish of Kars, established in 1968 to assess for fire protection. Recreational facilities were added in 2001 and non-fire related rescue in 2012. First aid and ambulance services (1972—2001) and community services (1986—2001) were formerly included.

Communities
Communities at least partly within the parish.

Beulah
Earle Wharf
Kars

Lower Kars
Tennants Cove

Bodies of water
Bodies of water at least partly in the parish.
Belleisle Bay
Saint John River

Islands
Islands at least partly in the parish.
Ghost Island
Hog Island
Pig Island

Demographics

Population
Population trend

Language
Mother tongue (2016)

Access Routes
Highways and numbered routes that run through the parish, including external routes that start or finish at the parish limits:

 Highways
 none

 Principal Routes
 None

 Secondary Routes:
 
 

 External Routes:
 None

See also
 List of parishes in New Brunswick

Notes

References

Parishes of Kings County, New Brunswick
Local service districts of Kings County, New Brunswick